The 1947 Loyola Lions football team was an American football team that represented Loyola University of Los Angeles (now known as Loyola Marymount University) as an independent during the 1947 college football season. In their first season under head coach Bill Sargent, the Lions compiled a 3–7 record and were outscored, 224 to 186.

The season included three games against teams from Hawaii's Senior League, including two games played in Honolulu, and the first game of a home-and-away series against Mexico's national military academy, Heroico Colegio Militar.

Sargent, a Loyola alumnus, was named as Loyola's head football coach and athletic director in February 1947. Sargent was 39 years old at the time of his hiring and had previously been the head coach at Loyola High School in Los Angeles. He replaced Tony DeLellis who resigned one week earlier.

Schedule

References

Loyola
Loyola Lions football seasons
Loyola Lions football